Hyper Island is a digital creative business school with a consultancy side specializing in industry training using digital technology. It was founded 1996 in Karlskrona, Sweden and has presence through offices or campuses in Sweden (Headquarters), Brazil, UK,  US, and Singapore.

Hyper Island offers full-time and part-time education programs as well as intensive courses aimed at industry executives. The different Hyper Island MA programs are accredited through Teesside University.

Hyper Island also offers short term training of working professionals to boost knowledge levels and understanding of digital culture and media, transformative technology and how these affect ideation, execution, workflows, client collaboration and business models.

Methodology and Philosophy 
Hyper Island focuses on nontraditional methods of education.
 Experiential learning
 Lifelong learning
 Reflection and teamwork

The Hyper Island methodology is inspired by the following researchers and theories:
 Wheelan's Integrated Model of Group Development 
 Swedish Defence College
 Luft & Ingham, Johari Window
 Schutz, Firo Model
 Rosenberg, Non-violent communication
 Kolb, Experiential learning model

Recognition and awards 
Hyper Island was once referred to as “The Digital Harvard” and has been listed by CNN as one of the “most interesting schools around the world”. In 2015 Hyper Island was awarded “Stora Annonsörspriset” ("Big Prize of Advertisement") for its contribution in educating designers, creatives and strategist to the Swedish and International Communication Industry.
In 2013 former Hyper Island CEO Johanna Frelin was named CEO of the Year in Sweden for small and medium enterprises.

References 

Training companies of Europe
Companies established in 1996